Down, Out & Dangerous is a 1995 made for TV thriller film directed by Noel Nosseck starring Richard Thomas and Bruce Davison. The film aired August 22, 1995 on Lifetime and August 23, 1995 on USA Network.

Plot
A father to be makes the mistake of helping a homeless drifter who turns out to be an escaped murderer.

Cast
Richard Thomas as Tim Willows
Bruce Davison as Brad Harrington
Cynthia Ettinger as Monica Harrington
Steve Hytner as Grant Cromwell
Jason Bernard as Detective Danner
George DiCenzo as Lance Fredricks
Christine Cavanaugh as Leslie McCoy
Melinda Culea as CeCe Dryer

External links
 

1995 films
USA Network original films
American serial killer films
1990s thriller films
American thriller television films
1990s English-language films
Films directed by Noel Nosseck
1990s American films